Crouch End railway station is a former station in the Crouch End area of north London. It was located between Stroud Green station and Highgate station on Crouch End Hill just north of its junction with Hornsey Lane. The station building was located on the road bridge over the railway but only small parts remain of the structure today.

History

The station was built by the Edgware, Highgate and London Railway and opened on 22 August 1867. The line ran from Finsbury Park to Edgware via Highgate with branches to Alexandra Palace and High Barnet. After the 1921 Railways Act created the Big Four railway companies, the line was, from 1923, part of the London & North Eastern Railway (LNER).

In 1935 London Underground planned, as part of its "New Works Programme" to take over the line from LNER, modernise it for use with electric trains and amalgamate it with the Northern line.

Works to modernise the track began in the late 1930s and were well advanced when they were interrupted and halted by the Second World War. Works were completed from Highgate to High Barnet and Mill Hill East and that section was incorporated into the Northern line between 1939 and 1941. Further works on the section between Finsbury Park, Highgate and Alexandra Palace were postponed and the line continued under the operation of the LNER. Because of wartime economies services were reduced to rush hours only, so that after the war the dwindling passenger numbers and a shortage of funds led to the cancellation of the unfinished works in 1950. British Railways (the successor to the LNER) closed the line temporarily from 29 October 1951 until 7 January 1952,. With dwindling passenger numbers the station was closed by British Railways after the last train on 3 July 1954 along with the rest of the line between Finsbury Park and Alexandra Palace.

The line continued to be used for goods into the 1960s and by London Underground for train stock movements until 6 October 1970 when it was completely closed. Today the track has been removed and the station buildings have been demolished but the platforms remain in situ. Most of the track bed between Muswell Hill and Finsbury Park is now the Parkland Walk.

Citations

External links

 Crouch End station in 1935. Note the early style (pre 1920s) telephone box.

 https://hornseyhistorical.org.uk/brief-history-crouch-end/

Disused railway stations in the London Borough of Haringey
Former Great Northern Railway stations
Railway stations in Great Britain opened in 1867
Railway stations in Great Britain closed in 1954
Proposed London Underground stations
Unopened Northern Heights extension stations
Railway station